Ballıqaya is a village in the Goranboy District of Azerbaijan. The village forms part of the municipality of Qızılhacılı.

References 

Populated places in Goranboy District